Litoral Varguense conurbation (   is a metropolitan area in Vargas, Venezuela, that includes 10 parishes, it is part of the Greater Caracas Area. It has a population of 341,325 inhabitants.

Cities
The principal cities of the area are (2013):
 Maiquetia (it holds the parishes of Maiquetia, Carlos Soublette and Urimare) (pop. 118,807)
 Catia La Mar (pop. 98,487)
 Carayaca (pop. 40,096)
 Caraballeda (pop. 29,982)
 La Guaira (pop. 20,228)
 Macuto (pop. 15,562)
 Naiguatá (pop. 14,516)

Parishes

The 10 parishes of the area are:

Tourism

Beaches

See also
 Greater Caracas
 List of metropolitan areas of Venezuela

References

External links
History
Geography
Geopolitical division
Law and government— State government
Law and government— Municipal government
Economy
Sites of interest
Folklore
Historical seats

Caracas
Geography of Vargas (state)
Metropolitan areas of Venezuela